The Three Men of Melita Žganjer is a 1998 award-winning Croatian film directed by Snježana Tribuson, who also wrote the screenplay for the film.

Synopsis
The film has been described as a "lighthearted comedy" and centers on Melita Žganjer (Mirjana Rogina), a 30-something single woman who works as a vendor in a small cake shop in Zagreb. Melita is infatuated with Juan (Filip Šovagović), a character in a popular Spanish telenovela aired on local TV, and at the same time tries to get Janko (Goran Navojec), the cake delivery man, to notice her. Her affection for Janko goes unnoticed and Melita turns to Jura (Ivo Gregurević), a police officer and colleague of her roommate Eva (Sanja Vejnović). However, Melita soon finds Jura's interest in her superficial and, upon hearing that Juan would come to Zagreb to play an UNPROFOR soldier in a locally produced film dealing with the Croatian War of Independence, Melita succeeds in meeting him, but is immediately disappointed as the Spanish actor is nothing like his character in the telenovela. In the end, Melita learns that Janko likes her and ends up with him.

Cast
Mirjana Rogina as Melita Žganjer
Goran Navojec as Janko
Suzana Nikolić as Višnja
Sanja Vejnović as Eva
Ena Begović as Maria
Filip Šovagović as Juan / Felipe Mulero
Ivo Gregurević as Jura
Ljubomir Kerekeš as Žac

Awards
The film won five Golden Arena awards at the 1998 Pula Film Festival, including Best Screenplay (Snježana Tribuson), Best Scenography (Vladimir Domitrović), Film Editing (Marina Barac), Best Supporting Actress (Suzana Nikolić) and Best Supporting Actor (Ivo Gregurević). The film was also screened at the 2000 Cinequest Film Festival.

See also
Cinema of Croatia

References

External links

The Three Men of Melita Žganjer at hrfilm.hr 

1998 films
1998 comedy films
1990s Croatian-language films
Croatian comedy films
Films set in Zagreb